This is a list of events that happened in Croatian television in the year 1963.

Events

Debuts

Television shows

Ending this year

Births
9 May - Sanja Doležal, singer & TV host
27 September - Daniela Trbović, TV host

Deaths